Anania elutalis is a species of moth of the family Crambidae. It was first described by George Hamilton Kenrick in 1917 and is found on Madagascar.

The head, antennae and palpi of this species are dark brown, the tarsi ringed with dark brown, the thorax and patagia greenish grey, the abdomen pale brown. The forewings are greenish grey, with a darker, curved antemedian line, a sinuous median line and a postmedian angulated line. The hindwings are pale brown without markings. The wingspan of this species is 32 mm.

References

Pyraustinae
Moths described in 1917
Moths of Madagascar
Moths of Africa